Tayyibi Isma'ilism is the only surviving sect of the Musta'li branch of Isma'ilism, the other being the extinct Hafizi branch. Followers of Tayyibi Isma'ilism are found in various Bohra communities: Dawoodi, Sulaymani, and Alavi.

The Tayyibi originally split from the Fatimid Caliphate-supporting Hafizi branch by supporting the right of at-Tayyib Abu'l-Qasim to the Imamate.

History
Upon the death of the twentieth Imam, al-Amir bi-Ahkam Allah (d. ), his two-year-old child at-Tayyib Abu'l-Qasim (b. ) was appointed the twenty-first Imam. As he was not in a position to run the Dawah, Queen Arwa al-Sulayhi, his Hujjah, established the office of the Da'i al-Mutlaq, who acted as his regent. The Da'i had now been given absolute authority and made independent from political activity.

Da'i Zoeb bin Moosa 
Da'i Zoeb bin Moosa used to live in and died in Hoos, Yemen. His ma'zoon ("associate") was Khattab bin Hasan. After death of Abdullah, Zoeb bin Moosa appointed Yaqub as the wali ("representative" or "caretaker") of the Tayyibi organization ("dawah") in India. Yaqub was the first person of Indian origin to receive this honor. He was son of Bharmal, minister of the Chaulukya king Jayasimha Siddharaja. Fakhruddin, son of Tarmal, was sent to western Rajasthan. One Da'i after another continued until the twenty-fourth Da'i, Yusuf Najmuddin ibn Sulaiman, in Yemen. Due to prosecution by a local ruler, the dawah then shifted to India under the twenty-fifth Da'i, Jalal bin Hasan.

Sulaymani-Dawoodi-Alavi split
In 1592, the Tayyibi broke into two factions in a dispute over who should become the twenty-seventh Da'i: Dawood Bin Qutubshah or Sulayman bin Hassan.  The followers of the former, primarily in India, became the Dawoodi Bohra, the latter the Sulaymani of Yemen. In 1621, the Alavi Bohra split from the Dawoodi bohra community.

There is also a community of Sunni Bohra in India. In the fifteenth century, there was schism in the Bohra community of Patan in Gujarat as a large number converted from Mustaali Ismaili Shia Islam to mainstream Hanafi Sunni Islam. The leader of this conversion movement to Sunni was Syed Jafar Ahmad Shirazi who also had the support of Mughal governor of Gujarat. Thus this new group is known as Jafari Bohras, Patani Bohras or Sunni Bohra. In 1538, Syed Jafar Ahmad Shirazi convinced the Patani Bohras to cease social relations with Ismaili Bohras. The cumulative results of these pressures resulted in large number of Bohras converting from Ismaili Shia fiqh to Sunni Hanafi fiqh.

The Hebtiahs Bohra are a branch of Mustaali Ismaili Shi'a Islam that broke off from the mainstream Dawoodi Bohra after the death of the 39th Da'i al-Mutlaq in 1754. The Atba-e-Malak community are a branch of Mustaali Ismaili Shi'a Islam that broke off from the mainstream Dawoodi Bohra after the death of the 46th Da'i al-Mutlaq, under the leadership of Abdul Hussain Jivaji in 1840. They have further split into two more branches, the Atba-e-Malak Badar and Atba-e-Malak Vakil. The Progressive Dawoodi Bohra is a reformist sect within Mustaali Ismai'li Shi'a Islam that broke off circa 1977. They disagree with mainstream Dawoodi Bohra, as led by the Da'i al-Mutlaq, on doctrinal, economic and social issues.

At present, the largest Tayyibi faction/sub-sect is the Dawoodi Bohra, whose current leader is Syedna Mufaddal Saifuddin. Taher Fakhruddin is also a claimant to the title of Dai al Mutlaq since 2016, although it is widely accepted that Syedna Mufaddal Saifuddin is the leader of the Dawoodi Bohras, in all aspects and administration.

References
The Ismaili, their history and doctrine by Farhad Daftary
Religion, learning and science by Lathan Young
Medieval Islamic Civilisation by Joseph W. Meri, Bacharach
Sayyida Hurra: The Isma‘ili Sulayhid Queen of Yemenby Farhad Daftary
The Uyun al-akhbar is the most complete text written by an Ismaili/Tayyibi/Dawoodi 19th Dai Sayyedna Idris bin Hasan on the history of the Ismaili community from its origins up to the 12th century CE. period of the Fatimid caliphs al-Mustansir (d. 487 AH / 1094 AD), the time of Musta‘lian rulers including al-Musta‘li (d. 495 AH / 1102 AD) and al-Amir (d. 526 AH / 1132 AD), and then the Tayyibi Ismaili community in Yemen.

External links
 The Hafizids and Tayyibids
 Abul Qaasim Maulaana Imaam Taiyeb (as) - The noor and rehmat of Haqq
 History of Ismailis
 A visual chart of different Shia communities
 The post-Fatimid period
 Doctrine of the Tayyibis